Maria Sharapova was the defending champion, but withdrew due to right shoulder injury.

Justine Henin won in the final, beating Tatiana Golovin 6–4, 6–4.

Singles seeds
Players seeded 1-4 received byes in the first round. Maria Sharapova, the fourth seed, dropped out of the tournament. Her bye was given to number five seed Ana Ivanovic

Singles draw

Finals

Section 1

Section 2

Qualifying seeds

Qualifying draw

First qualifier

Second qualifier

Third qualifier

Fourth qualifier

External links
 Official website
 WTA singles draw

Zurich Open
Zurich Open